The Hawker Woodcock was a British single-seat fighter built by the Hawker Engineering Company as the first fighter to be produced by Hawker Engineering (the successor to Sopwith Aviation). It was used by the RAF as a night fighter in the 1920s.

Design and development
The Hawker Woodcock was designed as a night fighter in 1922 to meet specification 25/22. The chief designer was Captain Thomson, and the prototype, serial number J6987, was first flown with a 358 hp (267 kW) Armstrong Siddeley Jaguar II engine in March 1923 with F. P. Raynham at the controls. It featured a two-bay wing.

The prototype was rejected because of lack of manoeuvrability as well as suffering from serious wing flutter and ineffective rudder control, with spinning prohibited. Following the first flight W. G. Carter took over as chief designer and changed the design, reducing the wingspan by 2 ft (0.61 m) and making it a single-bay structure. The powerplant was changed to a 380 hp (283 kW) Bristol Jupiter IV engine. The modified design was designated the Woodcock Mk II and first flew in August 1923, and after further modifications, was accepted for service with initial orders placed late in 1924. A number of accidents occurred in the early part of service, with the aircraft being prone to wing spar failures and collapse of the undercarriage but these structural weakness were cured by the end of 1925.

The Woodcock was armed with two .303 in (7.7 mm) Vickers machine guns, synchronised to fire through the propeller arc. The guns were mounted externally on each side of the fuselage, just below the edge of the cockpit.

The first order for the Royal Air Force was for ten Woodcock IIs, with the first six being completed without any night flying equipment. The service eventually ordered a total of 62 aircraft. One of the first batch of aircraft was given a civil registration to allow it to be demonstrated in Scandinavia. On return to the United Kingdom, the demonstrator was entered into the 1925 King's Cup Air Race but it crashed during the race in bad weather near Luton.

Operational history
The first aircraft to be delivered to the Royal Air Force entered service with 3 Squadron in May 1925 at RAF Upavon. No. 17 Squadron was the only other operational squadron, with first deliveries being made in March 1926. Once the type's early structural problems were solved, the Woodcock proved popular with its pilots. It was replaced by the Gloster Gamecock in 1928. However, some Woodcocks were still flying in 1936.

In June 1927 a Woodcock II of No. 17 Squadron was borrowed by the notable aviator Charles Lindbergh. He used the aircraft to fly back to Paris from London soon after his transatlantic flight in the Spirit of St. Louis.

Variants
Woodcock Mk I
 Single-seat night fighter prototype with two-bay equal-span wings and a 358hp Armstrong Siddeley Jaguar II engine, one built.
Woodcock Mk II
 Single-seat night fighter for the RAF with a Bristol Jupiter IV engine and other design changes, One prototype and 62 production aircraft built.
Hawker Danecock
 Single-seat fighter aircraft for Denmark with Jaguar IV engines and Madsen machine guns. Three aircraft were built.
L.B II Dankok
 Single-seat fighter aircraft for the Danish Army Air Service, and the Danish Naval Air Service. Twelve built under licence at Danish Royal Naval Dockyard in Denmark.

Operators

Danish Army Air Service
Danish Naval Air Service
 
 Royal Air Force
 No. 3 Squadron RAF
 No. 17 Squadron RAF

Specifications (Woodcock Mk II)

See also

References

Notes

Bibliography

 Granger, A. Hawker Woodcock Danecock series. Oxford: Taurus Press, 1973. .
 Jackson, A.J. British Civil Aircraft since 1919, Volume 1, 2nd Edition. London: Putnam, 1973. .
 Lumsden, Alec and Thetford, Owen. On Silver Wings: RAF Biplane Fighters Between the Wars. London: Osprey Aerospace, 1993. .
 Mason, Francis K. The British Fighter since 1912. Annapolis, Maryland: Naval Institute Press, 1992. .
 Mason, Francis K. Hawker Aircraft since 1920. London: Putnam, 1991. .

External links

Hawker Woodcock - drawing 
Hawker Woodcock - model

1920s British fighter aircraft
Woodcock
Single-engined tractor aircraft
Biplanes
Aircraft first flown in 1923